Big Soda is a term used by the media and various activist groups to describe the soft drink industry as a collective entity. The term connotes the business and lobbying power of soft drink companies who, like Big Oil and Big Tobacco, would use that power to influence politicians and voters.

Big Soda usually refers to the giants of the soft drink industry, The Coca-Cola Company, PepsiCo, and Keurig Dr Pepper.

See also 

 Other "Big" industries
 Big Four accounting firms
 Big Oil
 Big Tech
 Big Three (automobile manufacturers)
 Big Three (management consultancies)
 Big Tobacco

References

External links
 

Anti-corporate activism
Soft drinks